GGT may refer to:

Biology and medicine 
 Gamma-glutamyltransferase, an enzyme that catalyzes the reaction between a peptide and an amino acid
 Glutathione hydrolase, an enzyme that hydrolyzes glutathione
 A codon for the amino acid Glycine
Germline gene therapy, to treat genetic diseases

Language 
 Gitua language, spoken on New Guinea

Transport 
 Exuma International Airport, The Bahamas (IATA:GGT)
 Golden Gate Transit,  a public transport system in California, U.S.

See also 
 Galactolipid galactosyltransferase (GGGT), an enzyme in glycerolipid metabolism